The Trade Controls Bureau (TCB) authorizes, under the discretion of the Minister of Foreign Affairs, the import and export of goods restricted by quotas and/or tariffs. It also monitors the trade in certain goods and ensures the personal security of Canadians and citizens of other countries by restricting trade in dangerous goods and other materials.

References

Export and import control
Export and Import Controls Bureau
Foreign trade of Canada